Russell Leon "Rusty" Varenkamp (born March 19, 1976) is an American Christian musician, who is mainly a music producer and songwriter. He has received two GMA Dove Awards, for production, and is a Grammy Award-nominated producer and songwriter.

Early and personal life
Varenkamp was born, Russell Leon Varenkamp, on March 19, 1976, in San Jose, California, whose parents are Russell Leon Varenkamp, Jr. and Colleen Ellen Varenkamp (née, Mulrane). He was a 1994 graduate of Valley Christian High School.

Music career
His music production songwriting career commenced around 2003, where he has won GMA Dove Awards for Producer of the Year at the 41st Annual Awards, and his production of As Long as It Takes from Meredith Andrews, for Praise & Worship Album of the Year at the 42nd GMA Dove Awards. He has been nominated for his songwriting and music production at the Grammy Awards.

References

External links
 Official website

1976 births
Living people
American performers of Christian music
Record producers from California
Musicians from Nashville, Tennessee
Musicians from San Jose, California
Songwriters from California
Songwriters from Tennessee